Screentone is a technique for applying textures and shades to drawings, used as an alternative to hatching. In the conventional process, patterns are transferred to paper from preprinted sheets. It is also known by the common brand names Zip-A-Tone (1937, now defunct), Chart-Pak (1949), and Letratone (1966, from Letraset).

A dry transfer screentone sheet consists of a flexible transparent backing, the printed texture, and a wax adhesive layer. The sheet is applied to the paper, adhesive down, and rubbed with a stylus on the backing side. The backing is then peeled off, leaving the ink adhered to the paper where pressure was applied.

See also
 Ben-Day dots
 Dithering
 Grayscale
 Halftone
 Stippling
 Hatching, the representation of color by patterns of lines.

References

Drawing
Artistic techniques
Illustration
Dot patterns

it:Trasferelli#I retini